Cattiva Evasione, also known as A Naughty Elopement is a 1923 Australian silent film directed by P. J. Ramster. It was made for Sydney's Italian community, with a story by a local Italian actor, Angelo Zommo.

It is considered a lost film.

References

External links
A Naughty Elopement at National Film and Sound Archive

1923 films
Lost Australian films
Australian drama films
Australian silent short films
Australian black-and-white films
1923 drama films
1923 lost films
Lost drama films
Silent drama films